Star Wars Rebels is an American 3D animated science fiction television series produced by Lucasfilm Animation and set in the Star Wars universe.  It takes place over a decade after Episode III: Revenge of the Sith and progressing toward the events of the original Star Wars film. It depicts the Galactic Empire hunting down the last of the Jedi while a fledgling rebellion against the Empire emerges. The visual style of the series is inspired by the original Star Wars trilogy concept art by Ralph McQuarrie. The series features new characters, along with some from the original trilogy and from the previous animated series, The Clone Wars. The series comprises four seasons.

The series premiered as a one-hour television film, Spark of Rebellion, on October 3, 2014, on Disney Channel prior to the premiere of the series on October 13 on Disney XD. The second season premiered on June 20, 2015, with a one-hour television film, The Siege of Lothal. The third season premiered on September 24, 2016, with the television film, Steps Into Shadow. The fourth and final season premiered on October 16, 2017, with another one-hour television film, Heroes of Mandalore. Its final episode aired on March 5, 2018.

Dave Filoni, Simon Kinberg and Greg Weisman served as executive producers of the first season. Weisman left the show after the first season. Filoni was also the supervising director for the first two seasons, a role he relinquished after accepting a promotion that expanded his creative role into overseeing all Lucasfilm Animation projects; he chose Justin Ridge to succeed him for the third season. Filoni re-assumed the role for the fourth season.

The series has been generally well-received with several award wins and nominations. Rebels garnered praise for its writing, characters, voice acting, score, and expansion of the franchise's mythology, although it received some criticism for its animation. The show was nominated for the Critics' Choice Television Award for Best Animated Series and the Primetime Emmy Award for Outstanding Children's Program. Rebels became the first recipient of the Saturn Award for Best Animated Series on Television, winning for its final two seasons.

A number of tie-in media have been released to expand upon the series' lore such as the comic book series Kanan, the novel A New Dawn, and the novel series Thrawn. Characters, storylines, and elements introduced in the series would also appear in subsequent Star Wars media. Following the finale, the storyline left is set to continue in the upcoming live action series Ahsoka.

Premise

Fourteen years after the fall of both the Galactic Republic and the Jedi Order and the rise of the Galactic Empire, a motley group of rebels called the Spectres unite aboard a light freighter called the Ghost and begin to conduct covert operations against Imperial forces on and around the planet Lothal and on other planets that are menaced by the Empire.

Cast and characters

Main
 Taylor Gray as Ezra Bridger, a teenage con artist who is taken in by Kanan to be trained as a Jedi.
 Vanessa Marshall as Hera Syndulla, a Twi’lek pilot turned Rebel Commander, General, and the daughter of Ryloth freedom fighter Cham Syndulla.
 Freddie Prinze Jr. as Kanan Jarrus, formerly known as Jedi Padawan Caleb Dume, who survived the events of Order 66. He is Ezra's mentor and leader of the Ghost Crew.
 Tiya Sircar as Sabine Wren, a young Mandalorian warrior who's fixated on art.
 Steven Blum as Garazeb "Zeb" Orrelios, a former Lasat honor guard member and rebel who wants the Empire to pay for massacring his people.
 Dave Filoni as Chopper (credited as "Himself" prior to the series finale), Hera's astromech droid who can be a bit reckless.

Recurring
 James Earl Jones as Darth Vader (seasons 1-2, 4), a powerful Sith Lord who was once the Jedi Knight Anakin Skywalker, but is now the apprentice of Darth Sidious.
 Matt Lanter as Anakin Skywalker, a former Jedi Knight who became Darth Vader.
 David Oyelowo as Agent Kallus, an influential member of the Imperial ground team who is tasked with overviewing Imperial activities.
 Jason Isaacs as the Grand Inquisitor (season 1–2), a former Jedi Temple Guard who turned to the dark side and was tasked with hunting down surviving Jedi.
 David Shaughnessy as Commandant Cumberlayne Aresko and Taskmaster Myles Grint (season 1), Imperial officers stationed on the planet Lothal.
 Liam O'Brien as Yogar Lyste (season 1–3), Imperial officer stationed on Lothal.
 Keith Szarabajka as Cikatro Vizago (season 1–2, 4), a Devaronian crime lord who the Ghost crew occasionally runs errands and smuggles goods for in exchange for credits and information.
 Kath Soucie as Maketh Tua (season 1–2), a Lothal native and a minister for the Galactic Empire, and a graduate of the Imperial Academy.
 Phil LaMarr as Bail Organa (season 1, 3–4), the Senator of planet Alderaan, owner of the droids C-3PO and R2-D2, secretly one of the leaders organizing the Rebel Alliance, and adoptive father of Leia Organa.
 Dante Basco as Jai Kell (season 1, 4), a Lothalian aiding Ezra and the Ghost crew during the Imperial occupation of Lothal as part of Ryder Azadi's rebel cell.
 Dee Bradley Baker as 
 Kassius Konstantine (season 1–3), a dismissive Imperial Navy admiral in charge of the Imperial blockade on Lothal and later assisting in the Empire's rebellion pursuit.
 Captain Rex (season 2–4), a former high-ranking Clone trooper, who served under Anakin Skywalker in the Clone Wars. He also voices Commander Wolffe and Captain Gregor.
 Ashley Eckstein as Ahsoka Tano (season 1–2, 4), the former Padawan of Anakin Skywalker, who aids the rebellion with pivotal assets.
 Stephen Stanton as
Grand Moff Tarkin (season 1, 3–4), a ruthless Imperial officer who oversees many of the Empire's activities.
AP-5 (season 2–3), an inventory droid that sides with the Rebels and assists them in finding a suitable base after developing an unlikely friendship with Chopper.
 Keone Young as Commander Jun Sato (seasons 2–3), the leader of the Phoenix Squadron rebel cell.
 Sam Witwer (season 2) and Ian McDiarmid (season 4) as Darth Sidious, the tyrannical ruler of the galaxy and the Sith Lord known to the galaxy as Emperor Palpatine as well as the master of Darth Vader.
 Jim Cummings as Hondo Ohnaka (season 2–4), a Weequay who led a group of space pirates that operated on the Outer Rim called during the Clone Wars.
 Philip Anthony-Rodriguez as Fifth Brother (season 2), an Inquisitor of an unknown species and the partner of the Seventh Sister.
 Sarah Michelle Gellar as Seventh Sister (season 2), a Mirialan Inquisitor and the partner of the Fifth Brother.
 Gina Torres as Ketsu Onyo (season 2, 4), a Mandalorian bounty hunter working for the Black Sun, is an old friend of Sabine Wren.
 Clancy Brown as Ryder Azadi (season 2–4), the former Governor of Lothal and a family friend to Ephraim and Mira Bridger.
 Kevin McKidd as Fenn Rau (season 2–4), the Protectors of Concord Dawn, part of the elite Protectors organization who guard the royal family of Mandalore. 
 Sam Witwer as Maul (season 2–3), a rogue Sith Lord and former apprentice to Darth Sidious who seeks to hunt down his nemesis Obi-Wan Kenobi.
 Lars Mikkelsen as Grand Admiral Thrawn (season 3–4), a Chiss high-ranking senior officer of the Galactic Empire known for his tactical cunning. 
 Mary Elizabeth McGlynn as Governor Arihnda Pryce (season 3–4), a high-ranking officer of the Galactic Empire and Governor of the Lothal sector. She is mentioned in prior seasons but does not physically appear until S3.
 Tom Baker as The Bendu (season 3), a Force-sensitive alien who resided on the remote planet of Atollon and represented the "center" of the Force, between the light side and the dark side. 
 Nathan Kress as Wedge Antilles (season 3–4), a former Imperial TIE fighter pilot who defects to the rebellion.
 Zachary Gordon as Mart Mattin (season 3–4), a young human Rebel pilot and Commander Sato's nephew.
 Genevieve O'Reilly as Mon Mothma (season 3–4), the official leader of the Rebel Alliance.
 Michael Bell as Jan Dodonna (season 3–4), a general and leader of the Rebel base on Yavin IV.
 Forest Whitaker as Saw Gerrera (season 3–4), a Rebel extremist and former freedom fighter.
 Warwick Davis as Rukh (season 4), a Noghri assassin who, while technically not being a part of the Empire's forces, serves as an agent and tracker to Admiral Thrawn.

Guest appearances
 James Arnold Taylor and Stephen Stanton as Obi-Wan Kenobi, a Jedi Knight in exile on Tatooine.
 Anthony Daniels as C-3PO, a protocol droid who assists allies in the rebellion.
 Frank Oz as Yoda, the wise and powerful Grand Master of the Jedi who is exiled on the planet Dagobah.
 Billy Dee Williams as Lando Calrissian, a smuggler in the underworld.
 Julie Dolan as Princess Leia Organa, the princess of the planet Alderaan, Bail Organa's adopted daughter, and rebel.
 Robin Atkin Downes as Cham Syndulla, Hera's father who in the aftermath of the Clone Wars, opposes the newly established Galactic Empire's occupation of his world.
 Trevor Devall as Derek "Hobbie" Klivian, a former Imperial TIE fighter pilot, who defects to the rebellion.
 Gregg Berger as General Kalani, a super tactical droid who leads a still-active, but depleted, army of Separatist Battle Droids and Droidekas on Agamar.
 Matthew Wood as battle droids
 Ray Stevenson as Gar Saxon, the Imperial Viceroy of Mandalore, having been appointed as a figurehead leader by the Empire, and the leader of the Imperial Super Commandos.
 Sharmila Devar as Ursa Wren, Sabine Wren's mother, the current leader of Clan Wren, and former member of Death Watch.
 Tom Kane as Wullf Yularen, an admiral during the Clone Wars, becoming a colonel in the Imperial Security Bureau.
 Katee Sackhoff as Bo-Katan Kryze, a regent of Mandalore, former member of the Mandalorian group known as Death Watch during the Clone Wars, opposing the ideals of her sister Duchess Satine under Pre Vizsla until he was usurped by Darth Maul and forming the Nite Owls to oppose him.

Episodes

Release

Broadcast
The first two episodes, titled Spark of Rebellion, premiered on October 3, 2014, on Disney Channels worldwide and on Family Channel in Canada. In Australia, the series premiered on October 17 on Disney XD. The Siege of Lothal premiered on June 28, 2015, and the second season debuted on October 18. In Canada, the series premiered on October 19 on the DHX-owned Disney XD. However, due to DHX Media losing the rights to Disney content, the show was later moved to Disney Channel. The second season premiered on November 7, and it was moved to the Corus-owned Disney XD channel on December 1.

In the Middle East and Africa, Spark of Rebellion premiered on October 11 and the series debuted on October 18 on Disney XD. Siege of Lothal premiered on October 10, followed the official season premiere on October 17. In Southeast Asia, Spark of Rebellion premiered on Disney XD on October 4 and the series officially started on November 29. Siege of Lothal premiered on October 3 on Disney XD and Disney Channel, and the second season was released on October 24. In the United Kingdom and Ireland, the series debuted on October 16 on Disney XD. Siege of Lothal premiered on July 18, 2015, followed by the second-season debut on October 17.

Home media

Star Wars Rebels: Spark of Rebellion was released by Walt Disney Studios Home Entertainment on DVD in the US at all retailers on October 14, 2014. DVD bonus features include character shorts, a 3D model kit of the Ghost ship, and a preview of season 1.

The Complete Season One of Star Wars Rebels was released by Walt Disney Studios Home Entertainment on DVD and Blu-ray on September 1, 2015, in America, and in Germany on September 10, 2015. The Season 1 collection contains the expanded version of Spark of Rebellion with the Darth Vader/Grand Inquisitor prologue shown on ABC-TV. The Complete Season Two of Star Wars Rebels was released by Walt Disney Studios Home Entertainment on DVD and Blu-ray on August 30, 2016, in North America. The Complete Season Three of Star Wars Rebels was released on DVD and Blu-Ray on August 29, 2017. The Complete Season Four is announced to be released on DVD and Blu-ray on November 15, 2018, in Germany, and July 31, 2018, in the United States.

The series is also available on the Disney+ streaming service, which launched on November 12, 2019.

Reception

Ratings
In the United States, the one-hour special garnered 2.74 million viewers on Disney Channel and 2.40 million viewers on ABC (excluding Boston, whose local station WCVB preempted it for a Steve Harvey special). Worldwide, it delivered a total of 6.5 million viewers. On Disney Channel, the first and second episodes delivered 2.33 million and 1.92 million viewers, respectively. The third and fourth episodes garnered 2.32 million and 1.84 million, respectively. The fifth, sixth and seventh episodes were watched by 1.43 million, 1.30 million and 1.60 million viewers, respectively. The eighth and ninth episodes got 1.92 and 1.44 million viewers, respectively.

In Canada, the second episode was watched by 274,500 viewers, making it the most-watched broadcast ever on the network. In the United Kingdom, the film was the highest-rated broadcast that week, with 81,000 viewers.

Critical response
On the review aggregation website Rotten Tomatoes, the first season has received a 92% positive score, based on 13 reviews with an average rating of 8.20/10, the website's critics consensus reads, "Rebels adds new dimension to an unexplored sector of the Star Wars timeline, inserting a ragtag group of lovable characters into a galactic adventure that all ages can enjoy." Seasons 2 and 3 have received a 100% score based on 6 reviews for season 2 and 6 reviews for season 3, with an average rating of 7.40/10 for season 2 and 9/10 for season 3. Season 4 has received a 100% score based on 10 reviews with an average rating of 9.20/10, the website's critics consensus reads, "The Force is with these Rebels in a thrilling conclusion that plays to its characters' strengths while serving up plenty of galactic spectacle." On Metacritic, the first season has a weighted average score of 78 out of 100 based on 4 critics, indicating "generally favorable reviews". 

IGN and Variety in particular had strong praise for the pilot film, Spark of Rebellion, with their only criticism being the appearance of the Wookiees in the film, being cited as not all that impressive compared to the rest of the animation. SyFy Wire calls the series "Pure fun", further stating that it "captures the awe and joy of A New Hope" and is "thematically ambitious" with a "dramatic edge". Emily Ashby of Common Sense Media called the series "exciting" with cartoon violence and "positive messages." Ashby also argued that the series has a "broad appeal for kids and adults" particularly those interested in Star Wars.

Accolades

Other media

Films
Chopper and the Ghost appear in the 2016 film Rogue One: A Star Wars Story. Hera's surname is called on a loudspeaker at the Rebel base on Yavin IV, where Chopper can briefly be seen. In addition, the Ghost takes part in the climactic battle over Scarif.

The Ghost also appears in the 2019 film Star Wars: The Rise of Skywalker during the final battle over Exegol. The voice of Freddie Prinze Jr. as Kanan Jarrus can also be heard in the film as one of the voices of Jedi past who provide Rey with encouragement to defeat Emperor Palpatine.

Novels
On September 2, 2014, Del Rey Books published Star Wars: A New Dawn, a prequel novel by John Jackson Miller telling the story of how Kanan and Hera met (set about six years before the series). One of the first canon Star Wars novels to be released by Disney Publishing Worldwide and Del Rey Books, It includes a foreword by Dave Filoni.

In 2017, a new novel, entitled Thrawn, was released. The book marked the entrance of Grand Admiral Thrawn into the current canon. It was written by the character's original creator, Timothy Zahn.
A sequel to Thrawn, titled Thrawn: Alliances, was released on July 24, 2018. It explored Thrawn's partnerships with Darth Vader and Anakin Skywalker. Another Thrawn novel, Thrawn: Treason was released on July 23, 2019. It takes place during the events of Star Wars Rebels fourth season.

Hera Syndulla would go on to appear in Alexander Freed's Star Wars: Alphabet Squadron novel trilogy, as a general of the recently christened New Republic's eponymous starfighter squadron in the final days of the Galactic Civil War, hunting down the weakened Imperial forces after the battle of Endor and the death of Emperor Palpatine.

Comics
From April 1, 2015, through March 16, 2016, Marvel Comics published a 12-issue comic series, titled Kanan, and set during the events of the first season. Written by former executive producer of the series Greg Weisman and illustrated by Pepe Larraz, Jacopo Camagni and Andrea Broccardo, the story is centered on Kanan having flashbacks to his days as a Padawan in the Jedi Temple and the Clone Wars. The other members of the Ghost crew also appear.

In the summer of 2017, Marvel announced that a comic book miniseries adaptation of Zahn's Thrawn novel was being planned, scheduled to be released in early 2018. The first issue was released on February 14, 2018, with new issues being released over the following five months.

A few days after the series finale was aired, IDW Publishing released the seventh issue of the long-running Star Wars Adventures multi-era comic book series, which contained the first of a two-part comic arc, set between the second and third season, in which the Spectres embark on a mission to save a rare endangered bird from Imperial custody. The second part appeared in the next issue, which was released on March 28, 2018.

Video games
A side-scrolling run-and-gun game based on the show's first season, titled Star Wars Rebels: Recon Missions, was released by Disney Mobile on iOS, Android and Windows Store in early 2015, before being discontinued on July 28, 2016, due to the limitations of the support team. Ezra Bridger is the only playable character, with other characters available via in-app purchases, which also grant early access to most of the game's levels in the mobile versions and are required to play the full campaign in the Windows Store version.

Additionally, several of the characters from the series are playable in other games such as Disney Infinity 3.0, Angry Birds Star Wars II, Roblox (as virtual accessories and gears), Lego Star Wars: The Force Awakens (as downloadable content only), Star Wars: Galactic Defense, Star Wars: Force Arena and Star Wars: Galaxy of Heroes.  

Vanessa Marshall reprises her role as Hera Syndulla for the 2020 video game Star Wars: Squadrons, providing voice work and motion capture for the character.

Live Action Television series
The characters will be making their live action debuts in the upcoming series Ahsoka with Sabine being portrayed by Natasha Liu Bordizzo and Ezra will be portrayed by Eman Esfandi. Hera Syndulla, Huyang  and Chopper are also set to appear in the series.

Themes

Historical influences 
Characters in Star Wars Rebels have taken influence from Biblical, Hebrew, and Greco-Roman mythological names. Star Wars writers have often used biblical names for Jedi while giving galactic Imperial characters Roman names. In 2015 an interview was conducted with Dave Filoni and Simon Kinberg where Kinsberg stated that they wanted to connect to the original films by using the biblical naming scheme seen in the films. Both Caleb and Ezra are historically Hebrew names with Ezra translating to "Helper". Characters with Roman names include Clone Captain Rex which translates to "King" in Latin (although that character was created for The Clone Wars) along with Sabine Wren, Admiral Brom Titus and Admiral Kassius Konstantine.

References

Footnotes

Citations

See also

 2015 in science fiction

External links
 
 
 
 
 

 
Space Western television series
2010s American animated television series
2014 American television series debuts
2018 American television series endings
American children's animated action television series
American children's animated space adventure television series
American children's animated science fiction television series
American computer-animated television series
Disney Channel original programming
Interquel television series
Saturn Award-winning television series
Rebels
Disney XD original programming
Television series by Lucasfilm
Animated television shows based on films
Television series created by Simon Kinberg
Animated television series about extraterrestrial life
Anime-influenced Western animated television series
Television shows about rebels